Daryna Oleksandrivna Bondarchuk (born 20 May 1998) is a Ukrainian footballer who plays as a goalkeeper for Spanish Primera Federación club DUX Logroño and the Ukraine women's national team.

References

External links
Daryna Bondarchuk at BDFútbol

1998 births
Living people
Ukrainian women's footballers
Women's association football goalkeepers
WFC Zhytlobud-2 Kharkiv players
EdF Logroño players
Segunda Federación (women) players
Ukraine women's international footballers
Ukrainian expatriate women's footballers
Ukrainian expatriate sportspeople in Spain
Expatriate women's footballers in Spain